Arna Bontemps Hemenway is an American author and professor most known for his book Elegy on Kinderklavier, which won the PEN/Hemingway Prize, was a finalist for the Barnes and Noble Discover Award, and was long-listed for the Frank O'Connor International Short Story Prize. Today, he is an associate professor of creative writing at Baylor University. He is a graduate of the Iowa Writers Workshop.

Awards 

 PEN/Hemingway Prize
 Finalist for the Barnes and Noble Discover Award
 Long-listed for the Frank O'Connor International Short Story Prize

Publications

Books 

 Elegy on Kinderklavier
 "The Fugue" in Best American Short Stories 2015

Stories 

 “Wolves of Karelia”
 "The IED"
 "Helping"
 "The Fugue"
 "Asleep in the Monastery"
 "A Self-Made Man"
 "A Life"
 "In the Mosque of Imam Alwani"
 "Elegy on Kinderklavier"
 "Behind the Mountains Are More Mountains"
 "Fetal Anatomy Assessment"
 "This Life, Unbidden"
 "The Third Thing That Killed Cat Hoseman"

References 

Year of birth missing (living people)
Living people